Smash Hits may refer to:

 Smash Hits, a defunct music magazine
 Smash Hits (TV channel), a television channel spun off from the magazine
 Smash Hits Radio, a UK-based digital radio station
 Smash Hits (The Jimi Hendrix Experience album), 1968
 Smash Hits (All Star United album), 2000
 Smash Hits, a 1968 album of covers by Tom Jones
 "Smash Hits" (song), a 2007 single by Kid Canaveral
 Guitar Hero Smash Hits, a 2009 video game

See also 
 Smash hit (disambiguation)